Minister of Transport and Communications (sometimes Minister of Transportation and Communications) may refer to:
 Minister of Transport and Communications (Botswana)
 Minister of Transport and Communications (Finland)
 Minister of Transport and Communications (Greece)
 Minister of Transport and Communications (Norway)
 Minister of Transport and Communications (Canada), see Department of transportation
 Minister of Transportation and Communications (Peru)